Craig Jackson (born 18 September 1968) is a former Olympic swimmer who represented South Africa in the 1992 Summer Olympics in Barcelona. He competed in the men's 100 metre butterfly, 200 metre butterfly and 4×100 metre freestyle relay.

Formerly a youth coach of the South African swimming team, where he was Junior Coach of the Year in 2005, he is currently head coach at Melbourne Vicentre, a Melbourne-based swimming club.

References

1968 births
Living people
South African male swimmers
Swimmers at the 1992 Summer Olympics
Olympic swimmers of South Africa
South African swimming coaches
Male butterfly swimmers